Seoul Olympic Park Tennis Center is a tennis venue in Seoul, South Korea, located in the Olympic Park.  It hosted the tennis events for the 1988 Summer Olympics and has hosted several South Korea Davis Cup team and South Korea Fed Cup team ties.  The center currently hosts the Hansol Korea Open Tennis Championships.  The main stadium has a capacity of 10,000 people. The No.1 court has a capacity of 3,500, and the other 12 courts have a capacity of 900.

See also
 List of tennis stadiums by capacity

References
1988 Summer Olympics official report. Volume 1. Part 1. p. 180.

Tennis venues in South Korea
Venues of the 1988 Summer Olympics
Olympic tennis venues
Sports venues in Seoul
Sports venues completed in 1986
1986 establishments in South Korea
Olympic Park, Seoul
Venues of the 1986 Asian Games
Outdoor arenas
20th-century architecture in South Korea